Jael Ferreira Vieira (born 30 October 1988), simply known as Jael, is a Brazilian footballer who plays as a striker.

Career
Jael was born in Várzea Grande, Mato Grosso. Having previously played for Criciúma, Atlético Mineiro, Goiás and Bahia, he signed for Swedish Allsvenska club Kalmar FF on January 25, 2010. Jael's contract with Kalmar FF was terminated on May 12, 2010 following problems for Jael to adapt to Sweden, the club and the other players.

Career statistics

Honours
Joinville
Campeonato Brasileiro Série B: 2014
Campeonato Catarinense: 2015

Grêmio
Copa Libertadores: 2017
Recopa Sudamericana: 2018
Campeonato Gaúcho: 2018

References

External links
Kalmar FF profile

1988 births
Living people
Brazilian footballers
Brazilian expatriate footballers
Association football forwards
People from Várzea Grande, Mato Grosso
Criciúma Esporte Clube players
Clube Atlético Mineiro players
Cruzeiro Esporte Clube players
Goiás Esporte Clube players
Esporte Clube Bahia players
Kalmar FF players
Associação Portuguesa de Desportos players
CR Flamengo footballers
Sport Club do Recife players
Seongnam FC players
Associação Desportiva São Caetano players
Joinville Esporte Clube players
Chongqing Liangjiang Athletic F.C. players
Grêmio Foot-Ball Porto Alegrense players
FC Tokyo players
Matsumoto Yamaga FC players
Ceará Sporting Club players
Campeonato Brasileiro Série A players
Campeonato Brasileiro Série B players
Allsvenskan players
K League 1 players
J1 League players
J2 League players
J3 League players
Chinese Super League players
Brazilian expatriate sportspeople in Sweden
Brazilian expatriate sportspeople in South Korea
Brazilian expatriate sportspeople in China
Brazilian expatriate sportspeople in Japan
Expatriate footballers in Sweden
Expatriate footballers in South Korea
Expatriate footballers in China
Expatriate footballers in Japan
Sportspeople from Mato Grosso